Uttara High School and College (also known as Uttara High School, or abbreviated as UHSC) (Bengali: উত্তরা হাই স্কুল ও কলেজ) is a Bangladeshi primary school, secondary school also higher secondary school (grades I-XII) standing in few meters from Dhaka-Mymensingh Road (Asian Highway) close to Azampur bus-stand. It is situated in the heart of Uttara Model Town at Sector- 07 about two kilometers from the Shahjalal International Airport.

History 
The school was established in 1985. In the Junior School Certificate (JSC) exams, the school placed eighth in 2010 and seventeenth in 2011, among schools under the Dhaka Board of Intermediate and Secondary Education.

Certificates 
 Primary School Certificate (PSC)
 Junior School Certificate (JSC)
 Secondary School Certificate (SSC)
 Higher School Certificate (HSC)

Faculties 

 Department of Humanities 
 Department of Commerce
 Department of Science

Campus 

Uttara High School and College campus area size are 2.32 acres (9,400 m2) It has a ground field for students. The school has 170 teachers and staff. Uttara High School and College is in the Top 20 schools since 2010.

Library 
The Uttara High School and College Library are on the ground floor of the school building.

Sports 
Uttara High School and College host sports competitions every year. Where football, cricket, volleyball, and badminton compete in different sports.

Co-Curricular Activities 
The college has total 4 active extracurricular clubs.
 UHSC Science Club
 UHSC Debate Club
 UHSC Photography Club

 UHSC Research, Analysis & Analytics Club

Junior School Certificate (JSC)

Secondary School Certificate (SSC)

Higher School Certificate (HSC)

Notable alumni 

 Mahiya Sharmin Akter Nipa known as Mahiya Mahi, Bangladeshi film actress

 Nurul Haq Nur Ex VP of the University of Dhaka

References

External links
 
 Official website

Educational institutions of Uttara
Educational institutions established in 1985
High schools in Bangladesh
Schools in Dhaka District
1985 establishments in Bangladesh